Laguna is a Brazilian municipality located in the southern state of Santa Catarina, 120 kilometers south of the state's capital, Florianópolis, and north east of Porto Alegre. The population is 46,122 (2020 est.) in an area of 336.4 km². Elevation is 2 m. The BR-101 coastal highway passes through the municipality.

The city was founded in 1676 by rural people of the capitania of São Vicente. In 1714, the locality was recognized as a municipality, and in 1847 it received the status of city. It was the capital of the short-lived Juliana Republic in 1839. The city's flag is a tricolor with yellow, white and green, and has a coat of arms in the middle.

A pod of bottlenose dolphins resident in the sea off Laguna drive fish towards fishermen who stand at the beach in shallow waters. Then one dolphin rolls over, which the fishermen take as sign to throw out their nets. The dolphins feed on the escaping fish. The dolphins were not trained for this behavior; the collaboration has been going on at least since 1847. Southern right whales also can be seen from shores during winter to spring seasons.

People
Anita Garibaldi, wife of Italian revolutionary Giuseppe Garibaldi

References

External links

About the city's flag

Populated coastal places in Santa Catarina (state)
Capitals of former nations
Municipalities in Santa Catarina (state)
1676 establishments in Brazil